Colombiana is a 2011 French-American action film.

Colombiana may also refer to:

 Colombiana (cola)
 Compañía Colombiana Automotriz, an automobile manufacturing company
 Pleurothallis or Colombiana, a genus of orchids

See also
 Colombia (disambiguation)
 Colombian (disambiguation)
 Columbia (disambiguation)
 Columbian (disambiguation)
 Columbiana (disambiguation)